DWAY (104.3 FM), broadcasting as Care 104.3 The Way FM, is a radio station owned and operated by the Far East Broadcasting Company. Its studios are located along Maharlika Hi-way, Brgy. Arimbay, Legazpi, Albay, and its transmitter is located at Bariw Hill, Brgy. Estanza, Legazpi, Albay.

History
The station as established in 1973 on AM under the call letters DWAS. At the time since the inauguration broadcast started, it used to operate twice a day, on air from 6am to 1pm and from 4pm to 8pm, then later expanded from 4am to midnight the following day in 1989. In 2006, their original transmitter was destroyed by Typhoon Milenyo. However, in order to get it back on air, DWAS acquired a surplus transmitter tower used by FEBC's Manila flagship station, DZFE with the capacity of 10 kW. In August 2008, it went off the air for the second time after its transmitter was damaged by Typhoon Frank. On December 7, 2014, amid Typhoon Ruby, it returned on air, this time on FM under the call letters DWAY. Originally an emergency broadcast under "Unang Tugon", it became a fully-fledged station a few months after. At that time, it operates daily from 5am to 5pm.

References

Radio stations in Legazpi, Albay
Radio stations established in 1973
Christian radio stations in the Philippines
1973 establishments in the Philippines
Far East Broadcasting Company